Mind Your Own Business is a 1936 American comedy film directed by Norman Z. McLeod and written by John Francis Larkin and Dore Schary. The film stars Charlie Ruggles, Alice Brady, Lyle Talbot, Benny Baker, Gene Lockhart, and Jack La Rue. It was released on December 18, 1936 by Paramount Pictures.

It features an early appearance from Jon Hall then acting under the name "Lloyd Crane".

Plot

Cast 
Charlie Ruggles as Orville Shanks
Alice Brady as Melba Shanks
Lyle Talbot as Crane
Benny Baker as Sparrow
Gene Lockhart as Bottles
Jack La Rue as Cruger
Jon Hall as Scoutmaster Davis
Frankie Darro as Bob
William Demarest as Droopy
Robert Baldwin as Jimmy Jeeper
Nick Stewart as Butler 
Paul Harvey as Brannigan
Theodore von Eltz as District Attorney Adams
Duke York as Cruger's Henchman
Charles C. Wilson as Detective
David Sharpe as Tommy Finch

References

External links 
 

1936 films
Paramount Pictures films
American comedy films
1936 comedy films
Films directed by Norman Z. McLeod
American black-and-white films
1930s English-language films
1930s American films